Zamharir (also Romanized as Zamharīr; also known as Zamgari, Zamharī, and Zamharīz) is a village in Zonuzaq Rural District, in the Central District of Marand County, East Azerbaijan Province, Iran. At the 2006 census, its population was 162, in 64 families.

References 

Populated places in Marand County